Brunei Darussalam participated in the 2007 Southeast Asian Games, held in the city of Nakhon Ratchasima, Thailand from December 6, 2007, to December 16, 2007.

Medal table

Medalists

References

2007
South
Nations at the 2007 Southeast Asian Games